Davor Palo (born 2 November 1985) is a Danish chess Grandmaster. Having obtained the title in 2005 at the age of 19, he is the second youngest grandmaster in the history of Denmark, behind Jonas Buhl Bjerre and ahead of Bent Larsen. He originates from Bosnia and Herzegovina.

In 2013 he won the Danish Chess Championship.

External links

 
 Personal blog

Chess grandmasters
Danish chess players
Bosnia and Herzegovina emigrants to Denmark
1985 births
Living people